Jurij Rodionov was the defending champion but chose not to defend his title.

Denis Istomin won the title after defeating Nikola Milojević 6–7(4–7), 7–6(7–5), 6–2 in the final.

Seeds

Draw

Finals

Top half

Bottom half

References
Main Draw
Qualifying Draw

Almaty Challenger 2 - Singles